The 1939 Brooklyn Dodgers season was their tenth in the league. The team failed to improve on their previous season's output of 4–4–3, losing six games. They failed to qualify for the playoffs for the eighth consecutive season. The October 22 game against Philadelphia was the first NFL game to be televised.

Schedule

Standings

References

Brooklyn Dodgers (NFL) seasons
Brooklyn Dodgers (NFL)
Brooklyn
1930s in Brooklyn
Flatbush, Brooklyn